"How Much Is the Fish?" is a hardcore/euro-dance song by German group Scooter. It was released in June 1998 as the lead single from their fifth studio album No Time to Chill.  It is the first song to feature Axel Coon. It was made for the France '98 FIFA World Cup.

Track listing
CD Single
"How Much Is the Fish?" (3:45)
"How Much Is the Fish? [Extendedfish]" (5:23)
"How Much Is the Fish? [Clubfish]" (6:11)
"Sputnik" (3:06)

12-inch single
"How Much Is the Fish [Clubfish]" (6:11)
"How Much Is the Fish [Extendedfish]" (5:23)

Samples
"How Much Is the Fish?" interpolates the song "Zeven Dagen Lang" (Seven days long) by the Dutch band Bots. The melody originates from the traditional Breton song Son ar Chistr played on Alan Stivell's 1970 album Reflets. The title is derived from lyrics in the song "Buffalo" by Anglo-Irish indie group Stump, taken from the 1986 mini-album Quirk Out. The background music sample comes from the album version of the song "Paradoxx" from the German band 666.

Background
In May 2016, in response to increased popularity from a mention on The Tonight Show Starring Jimmy Fallon, H.P Baxxter answered the question about "How much is the fish?" on the Scooter Facebook page, revealing that "the fish" was actually the one they bought for their studio aquarium, and it cost 3.80 DM (1.94 €).

Chart performance

Year-end charts

Certifications

References

External links

Scooter Official site
Scooter singer finally reveals how much the fish cost
Scooter quotes

Scooter (band) songs
1998 singles
Songs written by Rick J. Jordan
Songs written by H.P. Baxxter
1998 songs
Techno songs
Songs written by Jens Thele